Dhivyadharshini "DD" Neelakandan is an Indian television host and actress who prominently works in the Tamil film and television industries.

Initially making her debut as an actress, she featured in supporting roles in films including Kamal Haasan's production Nala Damayanthi (2003), before going on to work in television serials, drawing attention for her performances in the Raadan Media ventures Selvi and Arasi. Since 2007, she has regularly been a host for shows on Vijay TV and in 2014, began hosting Koffee with DD, her own show.

Early life 
Dhivyadharshini was born to K. Neelakandan and N. Srilatha. Her sister Priyadarshini is also a television host, while her younger brother is an airline pilot. She attended Our Lady's Matriculation Higher Secondary School and has since has continued part-time education at Anna Adarsh College, Chennai.

Career 
Dhivyadharshini made her debut as a television anchor in 1999, when she successfully auditioned to be the child anchor for Vijay TV's Ungal Theerpu. She made a breakthrough as an actress, portraying a serious character in K. Balachander's television serial Rekkai Kattiya Manasu, shown on Raj TV, and subsequently, her performance helped her to popularity and gain further acting assignments. After a few more cameo appearances in films, Dhivyadharshini moved back to television, where she played notable roles in the Raadan Media ventures Selvi and Arase. She has also contributed as a dubbing artiste in films, notably voicing Vega Tamotia in Saroja (2008) and Piaa Bajpai in Goa (2010).

Since 2007, Dhivyadharshini has become one amongst the leading TV anchors as featured on Tamil television and has notably continued to host several reality TV shows on Vijay TV. She hosted the initial seasons of Jodi Number One alongside Deepak and Aravind Akash, as well being the initial host of Boys Vs. Girls.

Personal life 
She married her long time friend & assistant director Srikanth Ravichandran. But the couple announced their split in 2017. Now they have filed for divorce in a family court in Chennai. Dhivyadharshini has rheumatoid arthritis, which prevents her from long-distance walking.

Filmography

Voice Artist

Television

Shows

Series

Awards

Vikatan Award 
Ananda Vikatan, one of the leading weeklies of Tamil Nadu has been awarding the films, actors and technicians on various criteria.

References

External links 
 

Living people
Television personalities from Tamil Nadu
Actresses in Tamil cinema
Indian women television presenters
Indian television talk show hosts
Actresses from Chennai
20th-century Indian actresses
21st-century Indian actresses
Actresses in Tamil television
Indian television actresses
Child actresses in Malayalam cinema
Indian VJs (media personalities)
Year of birth missing (living people)